The United States Deputy National Security Advisor is a member of the Executive Office of the President of the United States and the United States National Security Council, serving under the President's National Security Advisor.

Among other responsibilities, the Deputy National Security Advisor often serves as Executive Secretary to the National Security Council Principals Committee, and as chairman of the National Security Council Deputies Committee. The role changes according to the organizational philosophy and staffing of each White House and there are often multiple deputies to the National Security Advisor charged with various areas of focus.

The position is held by Jonathan Finer, who assumed office on January 20, 2021.

List of Principal Deputies

List of additional deputy advisors
Aside from the principal deputy, since the September 11 attacks, there have been some cases of other deputy-level positions created with an additional specifier title and alternate role. These include:

Wayne Downing (2001–2002) for Combatting Terrorism
David McCormick (2006–2007) for International Economic Affairs
John O. Brennan (2009–2013) for Homeland Security
Ben Rhodes (2009–2017) for Strategic Communications
Lisa Monaco (2013–2017) for Homeland Security
Wally Adeyemo (2015–2016) for International Economics
Dina Powell (2017–2018) for Strategy 
Nadia Schadlow (2018) for Strategy
Victoria Coates (2019–2020) for Middle East and North African Affairs
Anne Neuberger (2021–present) for Cyber and Emerging Technology
Daleep Singh (2021–2022) for International Economics
Mike Pyle (2022–present) for International Economics

References

United States National Security Council
 
United States Deputy National Security Advisors